Pension Term Assurance (PTA) was a form of life insurance available within the United Kingdom. Although PTA had been available for several years, it only became mainstream when changes were made to pension legislation on "A Day", 6 April 2006.
Following these changes, PTA became a popular way of buying life insurance, as the premiums received tax relief, effectively making life insurance cheaper for the consumer. 

However, on 6 December 2006 the UK Government announced an important review of Pension Term Assurance (PTA). The Treasury indicated it was not happy with the PTA products on offer, and effectively stopped any more new PTA business being written. Those with existing policies were allowed to keep them running.

Despite what the name might suggest, Pension Term Assurance did not have to form part of a pension - it merely needed to be taken out at the same time as a new pension was set up.

External links 
Pension Term Assurance Explained - Complete Guide! (no longer available - 8th Aug 2013?)
Pension Term Assurance Guide
Read more at the HM Revenue and customs website

Types of insurance
Pensions in the United Kingdom